Çampınar (literally "pine spring") is a Turkish place name and it may refer to

Çampınar, Çelikhan  - a village in Çelikhan district of Adıyaman Province
Çampınar, Bolu - a village in Bolu central district of Bolu Province
Çampınar, İznik
Çampınar, Selendi - a village in Selendi district of Manisa Province
Çampınar, Mut - a village in Mut district of Mersin Province
Çampınar, Osmancık
Çampınar, Akdağmadeni - a village in Akdağmadeni district of Yozgat Province